James Speers may refer to:

 Jim Speers, Northern Ireland politician
 Robert James Speers (1882–1955), known as Jim, Canadian racetrack owner and racehorse breeder

See also
 James Speirs ("Jimmy"; 1886–1917), Scottish footballer
 James G. Spears (1816–1869), American general who served in the Union Army during the American Civil War
 Spear (surname)
 Spears (surname)
 Speer, a surname